The 2011 Vissel Kobe season was Vissel Kobe's fifth consecutive season and 14th overall in J. League Division 1. It also includes the 2011 J. League Cup, and the 2011 Emperor's Cup.

Players

Competitions

J. League

League table

Results summary

Results by round

J. League Cup

Emperor's Cup

References

Vissel Kobe
Vissel Kobe seasons